State Road 235 in the U.S. state of Indiana is a short route in southwest Jackson County.

Route description
State Road 235 begins at State Road 135 east of Medora and southwest of Brownstown. The Medora Covered Bridge parallels the road as it crosses the East Fork of the White River. Leaving Medora, the road travels north to U.S. Route 50.

History 
SR 235 in the 1930s was originally part of US 50.

Major intersections

References

External links

235
Transportation in Jackson County, Indiana
U.S. Route 50